Under Control is the second studio album by American indie rock singer Cary Brothers, released on April 6, 2010.

Track listing

 "Ghost Town" - 3:43
 "Under Control" - 4:15
 "Break Off the Bough" - 4:21
 "After the Fall" - 4:30
 "Someday" - 4:35
 "Belong" - 4:16
 "Over & Out" - 3:42
 "Alien" - 4:43
 "Something About You" - 3:46
 "Can't Take My Eyes Off You" - 4:15
 "Skyway" (Solo Acoustic) [Bonus track] - 3:46
 "Forget About You" (Piano Demo) [Bonus track] - 4:15

References

2010 albums
Cary Brothers albums